Freedom of Choice is the third studio album by the American new wave band Devo. It was originally released in May 1980 on the Warner Bros. label. The album contained their biggest hit, "Whip It", which hit No. 8 and No. 14 on the Billboard Club Play Singles and Pop Singles charts, respectively. Freedom of Choice peaked at No. 22 on the Billboard Pop Albums chart.

Composition
According to the band's commentary on The Complete Truth About De-Evolution DVD, the lyrics of "Whip It" began as a tongue-in-cheek anthem for then-president Jimmy Carter. The lyrics were also inspired by Norman Vincent Peale's 1952 book The Power of Positive Thinking and the "can do philosophy" espoused within. Devo co-songwriter and bass guitarist Gerald Casale also told Songfacts that the lyrics were written by him "as an imitation of Thomas Pynchon's parodies in his book Gravity's Rainbow".

"Mr. B's Ballroom" is a lyrically re-written version of an earlier relationship-focused song called "Luv & Such", later released on the Rhino Handmade two-disc rarities collection Recombo DNA in 2000. The lyric of "That's Pep!" is based on an early 20th-century poem by Grace G. Bostwick.

In 1995, the band recorded a new version of "Girl U Want" for the film Tank Girl. An alternate demo version of Freedom of Choice was released on Recombo DNA. This demo version lacks "It's Not Right", "Ton o' Luv", "Don't You Know" and "Freedom of Choice", but it includes demos of the "Whip It" B-side "Turn Around" and three unreleased tracks ("Luv & Such", "Time Bomb" and "Make Me Move").

Record World described a live version of the single "Gates of Steel" saying that ", its wall-of-sound guitar grind and Mark Mothersbaugh's vocal frenzy should satisfy AOR listeners."

In 2009, another demo surfaced entitled "Red Shark". This was an early version of "It's Not Right" with alternate lyrics and was offered as a download-only track for fans who purchased tickets to the Freedom of Choice album concerts.

Production
Freedom of Choice was recorded between October 1979 and early 1980, at the Record Plant in Hollywood, California. The album saw the band moving in more of an overt synthpop direction, even though guitars still played a prominent role.

The album was co-produced by Robert Margouleff, notable for his synthesizer work in Tonto's Expanding Head Band and with Stevie Wonder.

Promotion
Devo produced three music videos for the album. "Whip It" was based on a 1962 issue of Dude magazine that lead singer Mark Mothersbaugh had found in an antique store. The magazine contained a story about a dude ranch where the owner would whip his wife's clothes off. The video also played on the popular misconception that the song was about sadomasochism. "Girl U Want" saw the band performing on a television set in front of a live audience. The colors of the video were heavily saturated. In "Freedom of Choice", the band appeared as aliens. This video also featured professional skateboarders of the day.

Critical reception

The album received very positive reviews upon release and is widely regarded as one of their finest efforts. In a 1981 review, Robert Christgau of The Village Voice quipped that "if they ever teach a rhythm box to get funky, a Mothersbaugh will be there to plug it in." Writing in Trouser Press, critics Scott Isler and Ira Robbins described the album as "the band's most evocative pairing of words and music". AllMusic's Steve Huey praised the album, calling it "their most cohesive, consistent material to date".

The popularity of "Whip It" garnered the band several television appearances, including The Merv Griffin Show, American Bandstand and two appearances on the sketch comedy and variety show Fridays. A planned appearance on The Midnight Special was canceled when host Lily Tomlin saw the video for "Whip It" and objected to the content.

Track listing

Additional tracks

Personnel
Credits adapted from Pioneers Who Got Scalped: The Anthology CD liner notes.

Devo
 Mark Mothersbaugh – vocals, keyboards, guitar
 Gerald Casale – vocals, bass guitar, keyboards
 Bob Mothersbaugh – lead guitar, vocals
 Bob Casale – rhythm guitar, keyboards, vocals
 Alan Myers – drums

Credits adapted from the original album's liner notes:

Technical
 Devo – producer
 Robert Margouleff – producer, engineer
 Howard Siegal – engineer
 Karat Faye – assistant engineer
 Ken Perry – mastering
 Artrouble – album cover

Charts

Weekly charts

Year-end charts

Certifications

Tour 
The Freedom of Choice tour was the most ambitious Devo tour up to this time, with dates in Japan, the United Kingdom, France, Germany, Italy, the Netherlands and Canada. While the stage set was still relatively minimalist in keeping with previous performances, the stage was now illuminated by industrial walls and towers with flashing lights. In addition to the infamous red energy dome hats, the band also wore new Tyvek costumes, consisting of grey shirts and pants with long red strips of tape attached to them. Later in the set, Devo donned red, triangular vinyl vests, each one emblazoned with a letter of the band's name in yellow (as well as a hyphen), which can also be seen in the promotional video for "Freedom of Choice".

For the May dates the group wore white button shirts and pants, along with the Energy Dome, but from June onward they wore more traditional white radiation suits with red sellotape over in a cross formation.

The Freedom of Choice tour was captured on several different releases. The first was a promotional LP of an almost complete gig from August 16 at the Fox Warfield Theatre in San Francisco, part of the ongoing Warner Bros. Music Show series. This performance was recorded for the King Biscuit Flower Hour radio show. Shortly thereafter, a distilled version of that LP appeared as the DEV-O Live mini-album, containing six tracks from the album. In 2000, Rhino Handmade issued a limited edition CD of Dev-o Live, containing both the mini-album and the LP on one disc.

In 2005, a performance from the Phoenix Theater in Petaluma, California from the following night was issued as Devo Live 1980. This was released in DualDisc format, with one side containing the show in DVD format and the other containing an edited version of the show's audio in CD format.

Setlist 
 "Freedom of Choice Theme"
 "Whip It"
 "Snowball"
 "It's Not Right"
 "Girl U Want"
 "Planet Earth"
 "S.I.B. (Swelling Itching Brain)"
 "Penetration in the Centrefold"
 "Secret Agent Man"
 "Pink Pussycat"
 "Blockhead"
 "(I Can't Get No) Satisfaction"
 "Uncontrollable Urge"
 "Mongoloid"
 "Be Stiff"
 "Gates of Steel"
 "Freedom of Choice"
 "Jocko Homo"
 "Smart Patrol/Mr. DNA"
 "Gut Feeling"
 "Slap Your Mammy"
 "Come Back Jonee"
 "Tunnel of Life"
 "Devo Corporate Anthem"

2009 album tour
On September 16, 2009, Warner Brothers and Devo announced CD re-releases of Freedom of Choice and Q: Are We Not Men? A: We Are Devo!, as well as a tour performing both albums in their entirety on back to back nights. These concerts also featured stage set-ups similar to those used in 1978 and 1980 and featured the band wearing their original touring costumes.

The encore performances for the Freedom of Choice show were "Be Stiff" and "Beautiful World", the latter of which featured the Devo "mascot" Booji Boy on vocals.

The opening act for this tour was comedian/performance artist Reggie Watts and, for certain dates, JP Hasson (aka JP Incorporated, aka Pleaseeasaur).

References

External links

Devo albums
1980 albums
Warner Records albums
Punk rock albums by American artists
Albums produced by Robert Margouleff